The Australian Thoroughbred racing awards are given annually in Australian Thoroughbred horse racing. Voting on various categories is done by members of the Australian Racing Writers Association and include:

Australian Champion Racehorse of the Year
Australian Champion Two Year Old
Australian Champion Three Year Old
Australian Champion Sprinter
Australian Champion Middle Distance Racehorse
Australian Champion Stayer
Australian Champion Filly or Mare
Australian Champion International Performer
Australian Champion Jumper
Australian Champion Trainer

The equivalent in the United States is the Eclipse Awards, in Canada the Sovereign Awards, and in Europe, the Cartier Racing Awards.

 
Horse racing awards